Knut Hammer Larsen (12 April 1971 – 19 May 2009) was a Norwegian footballer.

He grew up in Tasta, and played for POL, FK Vidar, Stavanger IF, Viking FK, Staal Jørpeland IL, Buøy IL, Djerv 1919, Tasta IL and Vardeneset BK. For Viking he played in the Norwegian Premier League 1990 and the European Cup Winners' Cup 1990–91.

After retiring he worked in Lyse Energi. He lived in Stavanger and Randaberg, was married and had two children. He died in May 2009 at Rikshospitalet of leukemia, following several fruitless chemotherapy attempts.

References

Norwegian footballers
Stavanger IF players
Viking FK players
SK Djerv 1919 players
Deaths from cancer in Norway
Sportspeople from Stavanger
Deaths from leukemia
1971 births
2009 deaths

Association footballers not categorized by position